Kalmash (Qalmaş) is a rural locality (a selo) in Duvansky Selsoviet, Duvansky District, Bashkortostan, Russia. The population was 131 as of 2010. There are 2 streets.

Geography 
Kalmash is located 67 km west of Mesyagutovo (the district's administrative centre) by road. Komsomolsky and Oktyabrsky are the nearest rural localities.

References 

Rural localities in Duvansky District